Plicifusus kroyeri is a species of sea snail, a marine gastropod mollusk in the family Buccinidae, the true whelks.

Description

Distribution

References

 Brunel, P., L. Bosse, and G. Lamarche. 1998. Catalogue of the marine invertebrates of the estuary and Gulf of St. Lawrence. Canadian Special Publication of Fisheries and Aquatic Sciences, 126. 405 p. 
 Gofas, S.; Le Renard, J.; Bouchet, P. (2001). Mollusca, in: Costello, M.J. et al. (Ed.) (2001). European register of marine species: a check-list of the marine species in Europe and a bibliography of guides to their identification. Collection Patrimoines Naturels, 50: pp. 180–213 
 Hasegawa K. (2009) Upper bathyal gastropods of the Pacific coast of northern Honshu, Japan, chiefly collected by R/V Wakataka-maru. In: T. Fujita (ed.), Deep-sea fauna and pollutants off Pacific coast of northern Japan. National Museum of Nature and Science Monographs 39: 225–383
 Kosyan A.R. & Kantor Y.I. (2012) Revision of the genus Plicifusus Dall, 1902 (Gastropoda: Buccinidae). Ruthenica 22(2): 55–92

External links

Buccinidae
Gastropods described in 1842